Phyllonorycter cephalariae is a moth of the family Gracillariidae. It is known from southern France, Croatia, Greece, Hungary and Serbia.

The larvae feed on Cephalaria leucantha. They mine the leaves of their host plant. They create a lower-surface, tentiform mine. The lower epidermis has strong folds, while the upper epidermis is vaulted. The mine contracts strongly, causing the leaf margins to fold down and inwards. Last instar larvae also feed on the tissue of the roof of the mine. Pupation takes place within the mine.

External links
bladmineerders.nl
Fauna Europaea

cephalariae
Moths of Europe
Moths described in 1934